Angela Vautour (born April 10, 1960) is a former Canadian politician, who represented the electoral district of Beauséjour—Petitcodiac in the House of Commons of Canada from 1997 to 2000.

Vautour was elected in the 1997 election as a New Democrat, as part of a Maritime breakthrough for the party.

On September 27, 1999, Vautour crossed the floor to join the Progressive Conservative caucus. She stood for election as a PC candidate in the 2000 election, but was defeated by Liberal candidate Dominic LeBlanc. In 2004, she ran for the newly formed Conservative Party of Canada, but again was defeated.

Electoral record

References

External links
 

1960 births
Members of the House of Commons of Canada from New Brunswick
New Democratic Party MPs
Progressive Conservative Party of Canada MPs
Acadian people
Living people
Women members of the House of Commons of Canada
Women in New Brunswick politics